Glucametacin is a non-steroidal anti-inflammatory drug used for the treatment of mild or moderate pain associated with rheumatoid arthritis, osteoarthritis, and other rheumatological disorders. It has analgesic and anti-inflammatory effects.

Glucametacin is a glucosamine-containing derivative of indometacin.

References 

Nonsteroidal anti-inflammatory drugs
Amino sugars
Indoles
Chloroarenes
Methoxy compounds
Amides